National Route 419 is a national highway of Japan connecting Mizunami, Gifu and Takahama, Aichi in Japan, with a total length of 62.4 km (38.77 mi).

References

National highways in Japan
Roads in Aichi Prefecture
Roads in Gifu Prefecture